
Kłobuck County is a unit of territorial administration and local government (powiat) in Silesian Voivodeship, southern Poland. It came into being on January 1, 1999, as a result of the Polish local government reforms passed in 1998.

As of 2019 its total population is 84,762, out of which the population of Kłobuck is 12,934, that of Krzepice is 4,456, and the rural population is 67,372.

Neighbouring counties
Kłobuck County is bordered by Pajęczno County to the north, the city of Częstochowa and Częstochowa County to the south-east, Lubliniec County to the south-west, Olesno County to the west, and Wieluń County to the north-west.

Administrative division
The county is subdivided into nine gminas (two urban-rural and seven rural). These are listed in the following table, in descending order of population.

Rivers
Mały Potok
Sułtańska Woda

References

 
Land counties of Silesian Voivodeship